Aegidius (died 464 or 465) was the ruler of the short-lived Kingdom of Soissons from 461 to 464/465AD. Before his ascension, he became magister militum per Gallias (Master of the Soldiers for Gaul) serving under Majorian, in 458AD. An ardent supporter of Majorian, Aegidius rebelled against Ricimer when he assassinated Majorian and replaced him with Libius Severus; Aegidius may have pledged his allegiance to Leo I, the Eastern Roman Emperor. Aegidius repeatedly threatened to invade Italy and dethrone Libius Severus, but never actually launched such an invasion; historians have suggested he was unwilling to launch an invasion due to the pressure of the Visigoths, or else because it would leave Gaul exposed. Aegidius launched several campaigns against the Visigoths and the Burgundians, recapturing Lyons from the Burgundians in 458, and routing the Visigoths at the Battle of Orleans. He died suddenly after a major victory against the Visigoths; ancient historians say that he was assassinated, but do not give the name of the assassin, whereas modern historians believe it is possible that he died a natural death. After his death, he was succeeded by his son Syagrius, who was the last ruler of the Kingdom of Soissons.

History

Aegidius was born in Gaul, a province of the Western Roman Empire. It is believed that he came from the aristocratic Syagrii family, based upon the name of his son, Syagrius. While this evidence is not absolute, modern historians consider a connection to the family likely, by birth or marriage. Aegidius served under Aetius during the latter's time as magister militum (master of soldiers) of the Western Roman Empire. He also served alongside the future emperor Majorian. Aegidius was either a founding member of Majorian and Ricimer's faction, or else he quickly joined it, wielding considerable influence with Majorian. After Majorian became Western Roman Emperor, Aegidius was granted the title of magister militum per Gallias (master of the soldiers for Gaul) in 458, as a reward for his loyalty. The Ripuarian Franks conquered Cologne and Trier from the Romans in  457, and Aegidius was besieged in Arles by the Visigoths under King Theodoric II for a time in 457/458, before Majorian defeated him. In the same year, Aegidius led troops at the Battle of Arelate, against the Visigoths, where he is credited by ancient sources as being the primary cause for Theodoric II's defeat. As a result of the battle, Theodoric II was forced to return Visigoth territory in Hispania to the Western Roman Empire, and submit again to being a Roman vassal. Aegidius also recaptured Lyons from the Burgundians in 458.

After Ricimer assassinated Emperor Majorian in 461 and replaced him with Libius Severus, Aegidius refused to recognize the new emperor. Libius Severus was not recognized by the Eastern Roman Emperor Leo I, who was considered the senior emperor. Aegidius may have pledged his allegiance directly to Leo I, in order to legitimize his independence from the Western Roman Empire, and his retention of the Gallic legions. Aegidius repeatedly threatened to invade Italy, however he never did so. Modern historian Penny MacGeorge has suggested that this was due to pressure from the Visigoths, whereas others assert that he was unable or unwilling to march to Italy, leaving Gaul exposed. Around this time war had broken out Aegidius' lands and the Visigoths, over borders, and Aegidius was said by Priscus to have distinguished himself in the fighting. It is known that during this time, Ricimer ceded Lyons to the Burgundians, and Narbonne and most of Narbonensis Prima to the Visigoths, in exchange for alliances. Ricimer probably appointed a replacement for Aegidius, despite the fact that Aegidius retained most or all of his Gallic forces. The two people most likely to have been given the title of magister militum per Gallias (master of soldiers in Gaul) were the Roman general Agrippinus, whom Aegidius had previously accused of treason, or the Burgundian King Gundioc, who was Ricimer's brother-in-law. Around this time Aegidius sent embassies to the Vandal king Gaiseric, probably in an effort to form an alliance to oppose Ricimer. 

According to a story known to Gregory of Tours and Fredegar, the Frankish King Childeric I, who controlled much of northern Gaul, was exiled at some point after 457, and the Franks then elected Aegidius to rule them. The ancient sources go on to say that Aegidius ruled them for eight years before Childeric was recalled and reinstated as king. This story is considered fictional by most modern historians. Another narrative given by primary sources is that Childeric formed an alliance with Aegidius, although this has slim historical evidence, and is directly opposed by archeological evidence, which supports the theory of the Kingdom of Soissons, the historiographic name given to territory ruled by Aegidius and his son Syagrius, containing the expansion of the Franks. Ernst Stein suggests that the Franks may have placed themselves under Roman rule in the absence of Childeric. Michael Kulikowski posits that his  (armies) were so heavily Frankish at this point, that he could fairly be remembered as a king, rather than general.

Aegidius repulsed an invasion by the Visigoths in 463, routing them at the Battle of Orleans. In this battle, Aegidius' forces killed the Visigoth general Frederic, who was the brother of Theodoric. Some sources say that Aegidius' forces were bolstered by Frankish forces. Aegidius also won a minor engagement against the Visigoths near Chinon, at an unknown date. Despite these victories, he did not take the offensive against the Visigothic position in Aquitaine, possibly due to lack of resources, or due to threats from comes (count) Paulus, Gundioc, and the Western Roman generals Arbogast and Agrippinus. He sent a diplomatic party to the Visigoths in May 464, which would not return until September of that year.

Aegidius is recorded to have died suddenly, in autumn of 465. Sources of the time report that he was either ambushed or poisoned, but do not mention a perpetrator. Most modern historians consider it possible that he died a natural death, although some, such as Kulikowski, challenge this. After his death, he was succeeded by his son Syagrius. Syagrius is reported to have moved his seat of government to Soissons, which would later give Aegidius and Syagrius' breakaway government the historiographic name of the Kingdom of Soissons. The Franks defeated Syagrius and captured Soissons in the 480s.

Historiography
Aegidius was referred to by numerous titles in primary sources, many of which were contradictory. In the Historia Francorum by Gregory of Tours, he is twice called magister militum (Master of Soldiers), although Gregory describes him as being elected rex (king) of the Franks. Even more confusingly, Gregory does not give him any title while mentioning his death. The Liber Historiae Francorum refers to him initially as rex, but later twice calls him principem Romanorum (the Roman emperor). In the 'A' version of the Liber Historiae Francorum, he is called Romanorum rex (King of the Romans) at the time of his death, while the 'B' version calls him Romanorum tirannus (Roman tyrant), implying that he was a usurper. The Chronicle of Fredegar calls him comes (count). Based on the two references from the Liber Historiae Francorum which refer to him as emperor, and the occasional usage of the title of rex to refer to an emperor, some have asserted that he was in fact an emperor, although this is based upon shaky evidence, and is considered very unlikely by most historians. Modern historians give three possibilities for his actual status: The first possibility is that he declared himself king, and was called such by both his own kingdom and external barbarians. The second is that he was never called king within his own lifetime, but later folk or epic traditions gave him the title. The third is that he was referred to by a Roman title by his subjects, but called rex by barbarians, as it was analogous to the titles of their own rulers.

Information regarding his place of birth and his son comes from Gregory of Tours, the Chronicle of Fredegar, and the Liber Historiae Francorum. His service with Majorian under Aetius is related by Priscus, who also mentions his subsequent influence with Majorian as emperor. The loss of Cologne and Trier is provided by the Liber Historiae Francorum, and his encirclement in Arles by Paulinus of Périgueux's Life of St. Martin and Gregory. His accusation of treason against Agrippinus, whom he accused of surrendering the empire to barbarians, is known from the Vita Lupicini, which calls the claim maliciously false. Priscus also states Aegidius' refusal to recognize Libius Severus, and his threats to invade Italy, and he and Gregory speak to the conflict between Aegidius and the Visigoths. His continued dispute with Agrippinus and the Battle of Orleans is granted by Hydatius, Marius Aventicensis, and Gregory. The envoy he sent to the Visigoths is spoken of by Hydatius alone. Hydatius and Gregory both give the narrative of his death, and Gregory relates that he had invoked the help of St. Martin of Tours while in danger. Paulinus praises his bravery, character, and piety.

References

Notes

Primary sources

History of Byzantium by Priscus.
Excerpta de Legationibus.
Chronicle by Hydatius.
Chronica Gallica of 511.
Chronicon Imperiale by Marius Aventicensis.
Historia Francorum by Gregory of Tours.
Chronicle of Fredegar.
Liber Historiae Francorum.
Life of St. Martin by Paulinus of Périgueux.
Vita Lupicini.

Citations

Bibliography

 
 

Magistri militum
5th-century Gallo-Roman people
5th-century monarchs in Europe
Year of birth unknown
464 deaths
Kingdom of Soissons